Hopea celebica is a species of plant in the family Dipterocarpaceae. It is native to Sulawesi.

References

celebica
Flora of Sulawesi
Taxonomy articles created by Polbot
Taxa named by William Burck